Luís Sergjo Fernandes (born 1 March 1971) is a former footballer who played as a midfielder. 

Born in Brazil, Fernandes is of Lebanese descent; he represented Lebanon internationally at the 2000 AFC Asian Cup. He also played for Lebanese Premier League side Shabab Sahel between 2000 and 2006.

International career
Fernandes represented the Lebanon national team at the 2000 AFC Asian Cup; he was one of five Lebanese Brazilians in the squad. He scored an 82nd-minute equalizer against Thailand in the group stage.

Career statistics

International
Scores and results list Lebanon's goal tally first.

See also
 List of Lebanon international footballers born outside Lebanon

References

External links
 
 
 
 

1971 births
Living people
Brazilian people of Lebanese descent
Brazilian emigrants to Lebanon
Sportspeople of Lebanese descent
Citizens of Lebanon through descent
Lebanese footballers
Brazilian footballers
Lebanon international footballers
2000 AFC Asian Cup players
Association football midfielders
Shabab Al Sahel FC players
Lebanese Premier League players